Max Tishler (October 30, 1906 – March 18, 1989) was president of Merck Sharp and Dohme Research Laboratories where he led the research teams that synthesized ascorbic acid, riboflavin, cortisone, pyridoxine, pantothenic acid, nicotinamide, methionine, threonine, and tryptophan. He also developed the fermentation processes for actinomycin, vitamin B12, streptomycin, and penicillin. Tishler invented sulfaquinoxaline for the treatment for coccidiosis.

Biography
He was born in Boston, Massachusetts on October 30, 1906. His father  repaired shoes and he abandoned the family in 1911. Max worked in a pharmacy during the flu pandemic of 1918. He studied chemistry as an undergraduate at Tufts College, where he was a member of the Pi Lambda Phi fraternity.

In 1934 he earned his Ph.D. in organic chemistry from Harvard University. He married Elizabeth M. Verveer in 1934. He taught at Harvard from 1934 to 1937. His son, Peter Verveer Tishler, was born on July 18, 1937. In 1937, he took a position at Merck. His first project at Merck was to produce riboflavin. In the 1940s he developed a process for the synthesis of cortisone.

In 1970 he retired from Merck, and taught chemistry at Wesleyan University.

He died of emphysema at Middlesex Memorial Hospital in Middletown, Connecticut on March 18, 1989.

Education
B.S. Chemistry, Tufts College, 1928, magna cum laude
M.A. Chemistry, Harvard University, 1933
Ph.D. Organic Chemistry, Harvard University, 1934
Research Advisor: Elmer P. Kohler, Dissertation title: "I. The reduction of alpha halo-ketones. II. The action of organic magnesium halides on alpha halo-ketones and on alpha halo-sulfones."

Honors
Chemical Pioneer Award (1968)
Priestley Medal (1970)
American Institute of Chemists Gold Medal (1977)
National Medal of Science
National Inventors Hall of Fame
IRI Medal

References

Wesleyan University faculty
20th-century American chemists
National Medal of Science laureates
Harvard University alumni
1906 births
1989 deaths
People from Boston
Tufts University alumni
20th-century American inventors